The 5th annual Billboard Latin Music Awards which honor the most popular albums, songs, and performers in Latin music took place in Miami.

Pop

Hot latin tracks of the year

 "Lo Mejor de Mí", Cristian Castro

Pop album of the year, Male
"Romances", Luis Miguel

Pop album of the year, female
"Tierna La Noche", Fey

Pop album of the year, duo or group
"Compas", Gipsy Kings

Pop album of the year, new artist
"Evolution", Boyz II Men

Tropical/Salsa

Tropical/salsa song of the year

"Y Hubo Alguien", Marc Anthony

Tropical/salsa album of the year, male
"Contra la Corriente", Marc Anthony

Tropical/salsa album of the year, female
"Llévame Contigo", Olga Tañon

Tropical/salsa album of the year, duo or group
"Buena Vista Social Club", Buena Vista Social Club

Regional Mexican

Regional Mexican song of the year
"Ya Me Voy para Siempre", Los Temerarios

Regional Mexican album of the year, male
"Recuerdo Especial", Michael Salgado

Regional Mexican album of the year, female
"Con un mismo corazón", Ana Gabriel

Regional Mexican album of the year, duo or group

"Partiéndome El Alma", Grupo Límite

Other awards

Billboard latin 50 artist of the year
Luis Miguel

Billboard latin 50 album of the year
Juntos Otra Vez (Juan Gabriel and Rocío Dúrcal album)

Hot latin tracks artist of the year
Enrique Iglesias

Latin rap album of the year
"Rebotando", Ilegales

Latin rock album of the year
"Sueños Líquidos", Maná

Contemporary Latin jazz album of the year
Passion Dance, Herb Alpert

Latin dance single of the year
"Mueve La Cadera (Move your Hips)", Proyecto Uno

Songwriter of the year
Marco Antonio Solís

Publisher of the year
Bmg Songs

Publishing corporation of the year
Sony/Atv Music

Producer of the year
Rafael Perez Botija

Spirit Of Hope
Willy Chirino

Billboard Lifetime achievement award
Ralph Mercado

Billboard Latin Music Hall of Fame
Vicente Fernández

References

Billboard Latin Music Awards
Latin Billboard Music Awards
Latin Billboard Music Awards
Billboard Music Awards
Latin Billboard Music